This is a list of Jewish anarchists.

Individuals

See also
Jewish anarchism

Notes

References

Further reading

Jewish

 
Anarchists